Salesches is a commune in the Nord department in northern France. It is located 6 km south of Le Quesnoy.

History
The village dates back to 1131, when it was recorded as part of the property of the Abbey of Maroilles, later passing to the Bishop of Cambrai. Most of the local economy was agricultural, with two water mills to make flour.

Churches
The parish church is dedicated to Saint-Quinibert. In addition to the parish church, there is a small chapel, Chapelle Notre Dame des Prés, located alongside the Saint-Georges stream, accessible by foot from the rue de Viterlan.

Heraldry

See also
Communes of the Nord department

References

Communes of Nord (French department)